The Taipei City Hall Bus Station is a mixed-used skyscraper complex located in Xinyi District, Taipei, Taiwan.

The lower floors of the building serves as a transportation hub for bus and metro, with the metro's Taipei City Hall Station incorporated into the basement.

The 8th to 31st floors of the building house the W Taipei, a five-star hotel operated by W Hotels. It offers a total of 405 guest rooms. It started trial operations in February 2011, and official operations in March 2011.

Overview
The station covers an area of 2,500 ping (7934 m2) and operates using a BOT scheme for 50 years under Uni-President Enterprises Corporation. It is situated on the southeastern side of the intersection of Keelung Road and Zhongxiao East Road. The 150-meter tall station building has 31 stories above ground and 5 stories below. Plans for the station date back to 1998 under then-mayor Ma Ying-jeou.

It houses facilities for a shopping mall (Uni-President Hankyu Department Store) and hotel. The shopping mall has nine levels (including two underground) and has a total floor space of 8,000 ping (26,446 m2). The mall was expected to open by October 2010. The station opened for service on 5 August 2010, and was estimated to serve around 10,000 bus commuters per day. The entire station complex was expected to serve 100,000 people per day. Since opening, ridership has been above expectations, with around 24,000 people using the bus services daily.

The bus station is aimed at reducing congestion at Taipei Bus Station near Taipei Station, as well as serving the bustling Xinyi District. In addition to short-distance bus services, many long-distance bus services to cities in northern and central Taiwan originate from the station.

See also
 Taipei Bus Station
 Taipei City Hall Station

References

2010 establishments in Taiwan
Buildings and structures in Taipei
Bus stations in Taiwan
Transportation in Taipei
Xinyi Special District
Skyscrapers in Taipei